Tadao Okayama (5 July 1913 – 28 March 1998) was a Japanese cross-country skier. He competed in the men's 50 kilometre event at the 1936 Winter Olympics.

References

1913 births
1998 deaths
Japanese male cross-country skiers
Olympic cross-country skiers of Japan
Cross-country skiers at the 1936 Winter Olympics
People from Sakhalin Oblast
Sportspeople from Sakhalin Oblast